is a railway station in the city of Tochigi, Tochigi Prefecture, Japan, operated by the East Japan Railway Company (JR East).

Lines
Iwafune Station is served by the Ryōmō Line, and is located 19.3 km from the terminus of the line at Oyama Station.

Station layout
Iwafune Station has a single island platform and a single side platform connected to the station building by a footbridge. The station is unattended.

Platforms

History
It was renamed to its present kanji spelling on 1 March 1902. The station was absorbed into the JR East network upon the privatization of the Japanese National Railways (JNR) on 1 April 1987.

Passenger statistics
In fiscal 2011, the station was used by an average of 568 passengers daily (boarding passengers only).

Surrounding area
 Iwafune Post Office
 Iwafune Geological Museum

Film setting
In the 2007 animated film 5 Centimeters per Second, Takaki and Akari see each other for the last time at this station in 4 March 1995. Twelve years later, Akari departs from this station for her wedding in Tokyo. In the manga adaption of the film, Takaki also visits this station with his girlfriend in 2007.

See also
 List of railway stations in Japan

References

References

External links
 
 JR East Station information 

Railway stations in Japan opened in 1889
Railway stations in Tochigi Prefecture
Ryōmō Line
Stations of East Japan Railway Company
Tochigi, Tochigi